itsmy was a mobile social gaming network that allowed users to communicate with each other while playing games. It was owned by Gofresh, a company located in Munich, Germany. At its height, the network had more than 2½ million mobile phone users worldwide. The network was available in English, German, Italian, and Spanish.

After failing to make a profit for several years, itsmy announced its closure in March 2014. The site was scheduled to close on 29 April 2014, but due to data issues the closure was delayed and users could still use the network until May 1, 2014.

References

See also
 List of social networking websites
 Mobile social network
 Social television

Defunct social networking services
Mobile games
Casual games
German entertainment websites